Theo Mackeben, born 5 January 1897 in Preußisch Stargard, Westpreußen, died 10 January 1953 in Berlin, was a German pianist, conductor and composer, particularly of film music.

Life and career 
From 1916 to 1920 Mackeben studied violin and piano at the Hochschule für Musik Köln, as well as taking lessons from Jules de Westheim. He then became active as a café and radio pianist during the 1920s, at the Café Größenwahn and the Hotel Esplanade in Berlin.

In 1928 at the Theater am Schiffbauerdamm he conducted the first performance of Dreigroschenoper. Mackeben arranged the music from Millöckers operetta Gräfin Dubarry, for a 1931 production entitled Die Dubarry including an original song Ich schenk mein Herz nur dir allein.

In the 1930s he composed music for stage plays and over 50 films, including some directed by Max Ophüls, Gustaf Gründgens and Willy Forst. After the war he wrote a piano concerto and a Sinfonische Ballade for cello and orchestra, while also being conductor at the Metropol-Theater.

Recordings 
As conductor, Mackeben's recordings from the late 1920s through the 1930s include extracts from Dreigroschenoper and Die Dubarry, Scassola's Laendische Suite, Mendelssohn's 'Spring Song', and fantasies from Smetana's Bartered Bride, Zeller's Der Vogelhändler, Verdi's La traviata, Weill's Mahagonny and Suppé's Die schöne Galathee, on labels such as Telefunken and Berlin.

A selection of Mackeben's music was recorded by the WDR Symphony Orchestra Cologne conducted by Emmerich Smola and published in 1995 by Capriccio.

Works

Operettas
 1931: Die Dubarry
1932: Die Journalisten
1934: Lady Fanny and The Servant Problem
1934: Liebe auf Reisen
1938: Anita und der Teufel
 1943: Der goldene Käfig
 1950: Die Versuchung der Antonia

Film scores
 Chasing Fortune (1930)
 I Go Out and You Stay Here (1931)
 A Tremendously Rich Man (1932)
 Five from the Jazz Band (1932)
 How Shall I Tell My Husband? (1932)
 Thea Roland (1932)
 Liebelei (1933)
 Love, Death and the Devil (1934)
 The Grand Duke's Finances (1934)
 Make Me Happy (1935)
 The Devil in the Bottle (1935)
 Pygmalion (1935)
 Girls in White (1936)
 Under Blazing Heavens (1936)
 Dance on the Volcano (1938)
 Heimat (1938)
 The Life and Loves of Tschaikovsky (1939)
 Bel Ami (1939)
 Das Herz der Königin (1940)
 Bal Paré (1940) 
 Ohm Krüger (1941)
 Wedding in Barenhof (1942)
 Women Are No Angels (1943)
 The Bath in the Barn (1943)
 And the Heavens Above Us (1947)
 Chemistry and Love (1948)
 The Trip to Marrakesh (1949)
 Don't Dream, Annette (1949)
 Who Is This That I Love? (1950)
 The Sinner (1951)
 Miracles Still Happen (1951)
 The Sergeant's Daughter (1952)
 Captive Soul (1952)
 Piano Concerto (1945)

References

External links
 

1897 births
1953 deaths
20th-century classical composers
20th-century German composers
20th-century German conductors (music)
20th-century German male musicians
German classical composers
German male classical composers
German male conductors (music)
German film score composers
Male film score composers
People from Starogard Gdański
People from West Prussia